The 2020–21 Jacksonville Dolphins men's basketball team represented Jacksonville University in the 2020–21 NCAA Division I men's basketball season. The Dolphins, led by 7th-year head coach Tony Jasick, will play their home games at Swisher Gymnasium on the university's Jacksonville, Florida campus as members of the Atlantic Sun Conference. They finished the season 11-13 5-9 in ASUN Play to finish in 8th place. They suspended their season on February 26 due to some concerns over COVID-19.

Previous season
The Dolphins finished the 2019–20 season 14–18, 7–9 in ASUN play to finish in a tie for sixth place. They lost in the quarterfinals of the ASUN tournament to North Florida.

Roster

Schedule and results

|-
!colspan=12 style=| Non-conference regular season

|-
!colspan=12 style=| Atlantic Sun Conference regular season

|-

Source

References

Jacksonville Dolphins men's basketball seasons
Jacksonville Dolphins
Jacksonville Dolphins
Jacksonville Dolphins men's basketball
Jacksonville Dolphins men's basketball